Convergencia Nacional or the National Convergence alliance was a coalition of a number of Nicaraguan political organizations, formed in support of Daniel Ortega's bid in the presidential election of 2001. Despite losing the presidential election, the FSLN-led alliance made steady gains in the 2004 municipal elections, and Ortega was elected president in 2006. The alliance included Ortega's FSLN, Nationalist Liberal Party (the former ruling party of the Somoza era), Popular Conservative Alliance, Marxist–Leninist Popular Action Movement, Nicaraguan Christian Democratic Union, as well as the Unidad Social Cristiana PUSC (a dissident faction of the Social Christian Party) and dissident minority factions of the Sandinista Renovation Movement, Nicaraguan Liberal Alliance, Constitutionalist Liberal Party, Nicaraguan Resistance Party and  YATAMA. Majority factions of the latter 6 organizations have joined the anti-Ortega coalition Alianza PLC founded in 2008.

References

Defunct political parties in Nicaragua
Political party alliances in Nicaragua